Jubilee chicken can refer to one of several chicken dishes created to celebrate the jubilees of different British monarchs.

Jubilee chicken was created for the Silver Jubilee of George V in 1935, and was based on chicken dressed with mayonnaise and curry powder.

The second version of Jubilee chicken was created for Elizabeth II's Golden Jubilee in 2002. This version was radically different from coronation chicken and was highly publicised at the time as a modern evolution of coronation chicken. Jubilee chicken was distributed in hampers to guests at the concerts for the Golden Jubilee. In spite of both of these, its popularity has remained relatively limited compared to coronation chicken.

For Elizabeth II's Diamond Jubilee in 2012, guests at the Royal Garden Party were served "Diamond Jubilee Chicken", a variation of coronation chicken created by Heston Blumenthal. This recipe does not appear to have been released to the public.

Golden Jubilee chicken
Golden Jubilee chicken is a cold dish consisting of pieces of chicken in a white-coloured sauce dusted with parsley and lime segments.  The sauce is a mixture of crème fraiche and mayonnaise flavoured with lime and ginger; the chicken is also marinated in a combination of lime and ginger before being mixed with the sauce. It is recommended to be served with pasta salad.  Like coronation chicken, Jubilee chicken can be served as a sandwich filling.

See also
 Platinum Pudding
 List of chicken dishes

References

External links
 Official Recipe for Golden Jubilee Chicken

Silver Jubilee of George V
Golden Jubilee of Elizabeth II
Diamond Jubilee of Elizabeth II
British chicken dishes
British cuisine
Indian cuisine in the United Kingdom